William Lawson "Bill, Red" Mitchell (September 6, 1912 – December 12, 1984) was a professional ice hockey player who played 83 games in the National Hockey League with the Chicago Black Hawks.

References

External links
 

1912 births
1984 deaths
Canadian ice hockey defencemen
Chicago Blackhawks players
Detroit Olympics (IHL) players
Kansas City Americans players
Kansas City Pla-Mors players
Minneapolis Millers (AHA) players
New Haven Eagles players
Providence Reds players
Ice hockey people from Toronto